Roger S. Christiansen (born October 2, 1952) is an American television director.

Christiansen has worked as a director, associate director and technical coordinator for number of notable television series. His credits include Friends, Joey, Girlfriends, Hannah Montana, Drake & Josh, iCarly, Zoey 101, True Jackson, VP, The Haunted Hathaways, Suddenly Susan, Murphy Brown, Mad About You, The Drew Carey Show and For Your Love.

In addition, Christiansen has also taught film at University of Southern California School of Cinematic Arts, Columbia University Film Division, Tokyo University of Technology and The School of Film and Television in Cuba.

References

External links

1952 births
American television directors
Living people
People from New London, Connecticut
University of Southern California faculty
Columbia University faculty